The Venerable Griffith Vaughan (1656-1726) was an English Anglican clergyman.

A son of Edmund Vaughan, of Pisford, Northamptonshire, plebeian, in 1668 he became a chorister at Magdalen College, Oxford, where he matriculated on 3 May, 1672, aged 16, and graduated B.A. in 1676. In 1681, he incorporated at Cambridge and graduated M.A. from Pembroke College, Cambridge.
 He held livings at Coppenhall, and Hinstock; and was  Archdeacon of Ludlow from 1681 until his death.

References 

Alumni of Magdalen College, Oxford
Fellows of Pembroke College, Cambridge
People from Northamptonshire
Archdeacons of Salop
1726 deaths
1656 births